Ephysteris inustella is a moth in the family Gelechiidae. It was described by Philipp Christoph Zeller in 1839. It is found in Portugal, Spain, France, Germany, Italy, Austria, the Czech Republic, Slovakia, Poland, Hungary, Bosnia and Herzegovina, the Baltic region, Ukraine and Russia.

Subspecies
Ephysteris inustella inustella
Ephysteris inustella gredosensis (Rebel, 1935) (Spain, Portugal)

References

Ephysteris
Moths described in 1839